

Events
 Beginning of the Sicilian School
 Bernart Sicart de Maruèjols composed the sirventes "Ab greu cossire" about the effect of the Albigensian Crusade on Languedoc
 Peire Bremon Ricas Novas and Gui de Cavalhon compose a tenso together

Births
 Guido Guinizelli born between 1230-1240 (died 1276), Italian poet and 'founder' of the Dolce Stil Novo
 Guiraut Riquier (died 1292), an Occitan troubadour

Deaths
 Janna (born unknown), Kannada
 Walther von der Vogelweide (born 1170), Middle High German lyric poet

13th-century poetry
Poetry